Kambatta Viswanathar Temple is a Hindu temple dedicated to Shiva located at Kumbakonam in Thanjavur district, Tamil Nadu, India.

Presiding deity
The moolavar presiding deity, is found in his manifestation as Visveswar. His consort, Parvati, is known as Anandhanithi.

Specialty 
12 Shiva temples are connected with Mahamaham festival which happens once in 12 years in Kumbakonam. They are :
Kasi Viswanathar Temple, 
Kumbeswarar Temple, 
Someswarar Temple, 
Nageswara Temple, 
Kalahasteeswarar Temple, 
Gowthameswarar Temple, 
Kottaiyur Kodeeswarar temple 
Amirthakalasanathar Temple, 
Banapuriswarar Temple, 
Abimukeswarar Temple, Kumbakonam, 
Kambatta Visvanathar Temple and 
Ekambareswarar Temple. 
This temple is one among them.

Mint
During the period of Cholas, there was mint in this place. So this place was called as 'Kambattam' (in Tamil), the place where gold and silver coins were produced.

Mahasamprokshanam
The Mahasamprokshanam also known as Kumbabishegam of the temple was held on 26 October 2015.

See also
 Hindu temples of Kumbakonam
 Mahamaham

References

External links

Mahasamprokshanam 26 October 2015

Hindu temples in Kumbakonam
Shiva temples in Thanjavur district